Shaheed-e-Mohabbat Boota Singh is a 1999 Indian Punjabi-language feature film based on the real-life love story of Boota Singh and Zainab, starring Gurdas Maan and Divya Dutta in the lead roles. The film is directed by Manoj Punj and produced by Manjeet Maan. Arun Bakshi, Gurkirtan and Chetana Das played supporting roles. The film won the National Film Award for Best Feature Film in Punjabi at the 46th National Film Awards.

The movie was an international hit and was screened at many national and international film festivals, including the 1999 Vancouver International Film Festival and the International Film Festival of India. It is the first film by Maan's home production, Sai Productions.

Plot
The film stars Gurdas Maan and Divya Dutta in the lead roles. The film is set in the Punjab region around the time its of partition in 1947.

A Sikh ex-soldier, Boota Singh, who served in the British Army at the Burma front during the World War II, is in his thirties when he returns to his village near Jalandhar. All his age-mates are married, but he is unmarried. He has found no woman to marry as his youth is flying away. A hope to have a family of his own yet lurks in a corner of his heart. A trader assures Boota that if he could raise Rs. 2000/-, he would buy a young bride for Boota from UP or Bihar. Boota starts saving every penny.

Boota Singh rescues a Muslim girl
India got freedom in 1947 and Pakistan was born; communal riots begin on both sides of the new border. Boota's village comes in the grip of riots.

One day while Boota works in his fields, a beautiful young Muslim girl, being chased by the vengeful locals, comes to him for help. The youths demand the girl or Rs. 2500/-. Boota argues that he only has Rs. 1800, and is able to shake them off by giving them his life's savings. His hopes to settle down by raising dowry money are shattered when he needs to use his savings to rescue the Muslim girl, Zainab. With nowhere to go she stays with Boota Singh.

Boota and Zainab get married
The villagers object that Boota cannot keep Zainab in his home like this: he should either marry her or leave her in a refugee camp, where people bound for Pakistan live. Boota decides that, since he is far older, he should leave her at the camp. He is about to send Zainab off with a man bound for Pakistan and who is prepared to marry her there. But Zainab, who has learned about the sacrifice he made for her and is touched by his simplicity, asks Boota if he is so poor that he cannot even feed her two rotis per day to keep her alive. Boota Singh and Zainab fall in love and get married. Boota's life transforms overnight. Then they have a baby girl. Boota Singh is pretty happy, matrimonially speaking; he is leading a pleasant life.

The end
An uncle of Boota, who was scheming that Boota would die unmarried and the family property would go to him, becomes envious of his marriage with Zainab. A few years later, when India and Pakistan agree to deport women left behind in the riots, he informs the police that there is such a Muslim woman in their village. In Boota's absence police forcibly dump Zainab into a truck bound for a refugee camp (leaving the child behind).

Zainab is sent to her parents' home in the village of Barki in Pakistan. Boota sells all his land and goes along with his child to Pakistan illegally. He is beaten by Zainab's relatives. Then they inform the police and Boota is brought before a judge who is quite willing to free him if his wife owns up, but under pressure from her family, she backs off.

A disappointed and mournful Boota jumps with his daughter before an oncoming train. He dies, but miraculously, his daughter survives. Pakistani youth, overcome by this, hail him "Shaheed-E-Mohabbat Boota Singh" (lit. Martyr-in-Love Boota Singh) and erect a memorial and a trust in his name.

Cast

Music
The music director is Amar Haldipur and the playback singers are Gurdas Maan, Asha Bhosle, Anuradha Paudwal, Nusrat Fateh Ali Khan and Karaamat Ali Khan, with Amar Noorie as a guest singer. The movie has six original tracks:

 "Ishq Ni Darrda Maut Kolon," sung by Karaamat Ali Khan
 "Eh Kaisi Rutt Aayi" sung by Gurdas Maan
 "Meri Chunni Da Chamke," sung by Asha Bhosle, Anuradha Paudwal and Gurdas Maan
 "Gaddiye Ni Der Na Karin," sung by Gurdas Maan
 "Main Rowan Tarle Paawan," sung by Asha Bhosle and Gurdas Maan
 "Aseen Tere Shehar Nu," sung by Gurdas Maan
 "Ishq Da Rutba" sung by Nusrat Fateh Ali Khan

References

External links
 

Punjabi-language Indian films
Films set in the partition of India
1999 drama films
1999 films
Films set in the 1940s
Films set in Punjab, India
India–Pakistan relations in popular culture
1990s Punjabi-language films
Films set in the British Raj
Best Punjabi Feature Film National Film Award winners
Films set in Lahore
Indian interfaith romance films